Middle East University may refer to:
Middle East University (Jordan)
Middle East University (Lebanon)
Middle East Technical University
It may also refer to:
 American University of the Middle East
 University of the Middle East Project